Ambystoma rivulare is a species of mole salamander in the family Ambystomatidae. Typically gains a lot of population distribution in the Trans-Mexican Volcanic Belt around central Mexico City. Found in various small or medium-sized ponds and lakes that have large and wide range of food options, all within a distance of at least 2 km. It is endemic to Mexico. Its natural habitats are subtropical or tropical moist montane forests and rivers. It is threatened by habitat loss. The larvae, who continue to prey on the same organisms as they grow, prey mainly on ostracods as well as some gastropods and assorted other prey with limited diversity. Ambystoma rivulare continue to live in the river they hatch in post-metamorphosis.

References

Mole salamanders
Taxonomy articles created by Polbot
Amphibians described in 1940